The threshold hypothesis is a hypothesis concerning second language acquisition set forth in a study by Cummins (1976), which stated that a minimum threshold in language proficiency must be passed before a second-language speaker can reap any benefits from language. It also states that, in order to gain proficiency in a second language, the learner must also have passed a certain and age appropriate level of competence in his or her first language.

References

Second-language acquisition